The flag of North Western Province, was adopted for the North Western Province of Sri Lanka in 1987.

Symbolism
The flag of the North Western Province is of a brown Lion with a sun and moon symbol on a white background. On the background there 15 small eight-pointed cross-stars. The whole flag is surrounded by a green and brown woven border.

See also
 Flag of Sri Lanka
 List of Sri Lankan flags

References

External links
 Chief Secretariat of North Western Province
 Flagspot
 Sri Lanka.Asia

North Western Province
North Western Province
North Western Province, Sri Lanka
North Western Province
Flags displaying animals